Gorton North is a defunct local government ward in the Gorton area of the City of Manchester. The population of Gorton North ward at the 2011 census was 16,440. Under boundary changes by the Local Government Boundary Commission for England (LGBCE) the ward was abolished and replaced with the new electoral ward Gorton and Abbey Hey from May 2018.

Governance 

Gorton North was in the parliamentary constituency of Manchester Gorton. It was represented in Westminster by Afzal Khan since June 2017. The city councillors for the ward are Nilofar Siddiqi (Labour), John Hughes (Labour) and Afia Kamal (Labour). Historically Gorton North was a safe Labour seat. Previous Labour councillors for Gorton North were Colin Brierley, Tom Hamnett and Anne Unwin (previously Anne McQueen).

Councillors
Nilofar Siddiqi (Lab), John Hughes (Lab), and Afia Kamal (Lab)

 indicates seat up for re-election.
 indicates ward abolished and replaced with new ward: Gorton and Abbey Hey.

Geography
Gorton North was bounded by the neighbourhoods of Bradford to the north, Ardwick to the east, Longsight and Gorton South to the south and Fairfield, Tameside to the west. It contained Belle Vue Stadium and Gorton Monastery.

References

External links
 Office for National Statistics

Manchester City Council Wards